Shmuel Laviv-Lubin (born 13 July 1923) is an Israeli former sports shooter. He competed in the 300 m rifle, three positions event at the 1952 Summer Olympics.

References

1923 births
Living people
Israeli male sport shooters
Olympic shooters of Israel
Shooters at the 1952 Summer Olympics
Place of birth missing (living people)